Culladia strophaea is a species of moth in the family Crambidae. It is endemic to New Zealand. The taxonomy of this species is currently uncertain.

Taxonomy
This species was first described by Edward Meyrick in 1905 as Argyria strophaea using specimens collected in Wellington by George Hudson. Hudson discussed and illustrated the species under this name in his 1928 book The Butterflies and Moths of New Zealand. The lectotype of this species is held at the Natural History Museum, London.

In 1973 D. E. Gaskin placed A. strophaea within the genus Culladia. This placement is currently under debate and is regarded by some scientists as erroneous. As a result, this species is also referred to as Argyria (s.l.) strophaea or alternatively by its original name despite the later also being regarded as erroneous.

Description
Meyrick described this species as follows:

Distribution
This species is endemic to New Zealand. This species can be found in the North Island as well as in the provinces of Nelson and Westland in the South Island. Other than the type locality of Wellington, this species has also been found at Whakarewarewa, Raurimu, Whanganui, Haruru falls in the Bay of Islands, Lake Taupo, Bluff Hill in Napier, and at Lake Rotorua.

Biology and behaviour
Larvae of this species have been found in soil. This species is on the wing in January. Specimens of this species have been collected with mercury vapour light traps and 15watt UV light traps. Alfred Philpott studied the male genitalia of this species in 1929.

Host species and habitat
It frequents stony cuttings, often by roadsides, near forest habitat.

References

Crambini
Moths described in 1905
Endemic fauna of New Zealand
Taxa named by Edward Meyrick
Moths of New Zealand
Endemic moths of New Zealand